Bobby Reynolds was the defending champion but decided not to participate.
Denis Zivkovic won the title, defeating Rajeev Ram 7–6(7–5), 6–4 in the final.

Seeds

Draw

Finals

Top half

Bottom half

References
 Main Draw
 Qualifying Draw

Torneo Internacional AGT - Singles
2012 Singles